Armando Heeb (born 25 September 1990) is a Liechtensteiner footballer who currently plays for Swiss club FC Buchs.

Career

Club career
In the summer 2019, Heeb returned to FC Buchs for a second spell at the club.

International career
He is a member of the Liechtenstein national football team, making his debut in a friendly against San Marino on 31 March 2015. Heeb also made 10 appearances for the Liechtenstein U21 team between 2009 and 2012.

References

External links

1990 births
Living people
People from Vaduz

Liechtenstein people of Swiss descent
Liechtenstein footballers
Association football midfielders
USV Eschen/Mauren players
FC Balzers players
FC Chur 97 players
Swiss Promotion League players
Swiss 1. Liga (football) players
2. Liga Interregional players
Liechtenstein youth international footballers
Liechtenstein under-21 international footballers
Liechtenstein international footballers